"Biker Like an Icon" is a song by Paul McCartney  from his 1993 album Off the Ground. It was released as 7" and CD singles.

History
Commenting this song, Paul McCartney stated that the line "Biker like an icon" came from a conversation about photo cameras with his wife Linda McCartney. The phrase "I like a Leica" became "I like a Nikon" and the lyrics were built around that line with a story of a girl loving a biker like an icon. The song reached number 62 in Germany.

Music Video
The music video for the song first aired on MTV's First Look television show. The clip was repeated the following day.

B-sides
A live version of the song "Biker Like an Icon" is taken from Paul is Live album. The songs "Things We Said Today" and "Midnight Special" were recorded live at the MTV Unplugged in 1991 but not included on McCartney's Unplugged (The Official Bootleg) live album.

Track listing
7" single, CD single version 1
 "Biker Like an Icon"
 "Things We Said Today"

CD single version 2
 "Biker Like an Icon"
 "Biker Like an Icon" (live)

CD single version 3
 "Biker Like an Icon"
 "Midnight Special"
 "Biker Like an Icon" (live)

EP Promo
 "Biker Like an Icon"
 "Things We Said Today"
 "Mean Woman Blues"
 "Midnight Special"

References

Paul McCartney songs
1993 singles
Songs written by Paul McCartney
Song recordings produced by Paul McCartney
Music published by MPL Music Publishing
1993 songs
Parlophone singles